Kalevala (Russian: Калевала) is a Russian folk metal band.

Name

The name of the band is derived from the Finnish national epic. The group chose this name because of lead vocalist Xenia Markevich's Finnish parents. Moreover, the band is inspired by ancient Finnish and Sami music, Finno-Ugric legends, and contemporary Finnish bands like Finntroll, Korpiklaani, etc.

History

After a concert in Penza on 15 April 2007 with Nevid, singer Xenia and guitarist Nikita Andrianov decided to leave the band and start a new one. Together with keyboardist and accordion player Alexandr Oleinikov, bassist Alexandr Schmel, and drummer Mark Vasili, they started Kalevala.

After releasing their first demo in 2007, they began playing shows around various Russian cities, including Moscow and Saint Petersburg.

In April 2008, the band released their debut album, Kudel Belosnezhnogo L'na. One year later, they came out with their second record, Kukushkiny Djeti, followed by Vjed'ma a year after.

In a 2011 interview, Andrianov discussed the band's intention to release an acoustic album under the name Sami Sun.

In 2016, Kalevala held their first concert tour outside of the former Soviet Union, named Hail the Spring!, visiting Eastern Europe, France, and Berlin, Germany.

Band members
Current
 Xenia Markevich – vocals
 Nikita Andrianov – guitar
 Alex Mitrofanov – bass
 Denis Zolotov – drums
 Aleksandr "olen" Oleynikov – accordion, keyboards

Past
 Mark Vasili – drums
 Aleksandr "bumblebee" Smel – bass, mouth harp
 Kirill "Kesha" Perov – drums

Discography
Studio albums
 Kudel Belosnezhnogo L'na / Кудель белоснежного льна (2008)
 Kukushkiny Deti / Кукушкины дети (2009)
 Ved'ma / Ведьма (2010)
 Luna I Grosh / Луна и Грош (2013)
 Metel / Метель (2017)

EPs
 Таусень-Рада (2009)
 Доху я купила (2014)

Live albums
 Osen v stile folk / Осень в Стиле фолк (2012)

Singles
 "Demo '07" (2007)
 "Tausen-rada / Таусень-рада" (2009)
 "Kolocolchick / Колокольчик" (2009)
 "Сон-река" (2011)
 "Волчий зов" (2014)
 "Благодар тебе, Велесе" (2020)

References

External links
 

Kalevala
Kalevala
Russian folk metal musical groups
2007 establishments in Russia